The Bristen (3,073 m) is a mountain in the Glarus Alps, overlooking the valley of the Reuss and located to the south of Amsteg in the canton of Uri, Switzerland. The mountain is located about four kilometres north of Piz Giuv and the border with Graubünden. The Bristen is considered one of the main landmarks of the Canton of Uri.

Geographic setting and description
The Bristen is located about three kilometers to the south of the village also called Bristen in the Maderanertal and about four kilometers north of Piz Giuv, with the Portlilücke (2'506 m) in between.

An arête on the north side of the mountain is divided after 200 meters into the northern arête and the northeastern arête. Located below the northern arête on 2'095 m is the Bristensee - two hectare wide and 6,5 meters deep. On the western side of the mountain a steep arête leads down to the Fellital, the southern side is marked by another arête leading to the Zwächten (2'853 m), which goes further to the Portlilücke. 
To the east of the Bristen, on 2'052 m lies the Etzlihütte.

Geology
Geologically the Bristen belongs to the aarmassif. The southern part of the mountain consists of several different types of rocks, among them rhyolite and amphibolite. Further to the south the typical aare-granite can be found. For amateur geology the region around the Bristen is interesting, as it is famous for its many different types of minerals and quartz.

References

External links

Bristen on Summitpost

Mountains of the Alps
Alpine three-thousanders
Mountains of the canton of Uri
Mountains of Switzerland